The 2019 Kansas City mayoral election took place on June 18, 2019, to elect the next mayor of Kansas City, Missouri. The election was held concurrently with various other local elections, and was officially nonpartisan.

Incumbent mayor Sly James, in office since 2011, was term-limited and could not seek the office again.

In the nonpartisan primary held on April 2, 2019, city council members Jolie Justus and Quinton Lucas were the top-two vote winners with 23 and 18 percent of the vote, respectively.  In the general election on June 18, 2019, Lucas got 59 percent vs. 41 percent for Justus.

Candidates

The filing deadline was January 8.

Declared
 Alissia Canady, city councilwoman
 Clay Chastain, electrical engineer and home renovator who currently lives in Bedford, Virginia
 Phil Glynn, businessman, affiliated with the Democratic Party
 Jolie Justus, city councilwoman, former member of the Missouri Senate
 Henry Klein, charity chairman
 Vincent Lee, real estate broker
 Quinton Lucas, city councilman, affiliated with the Democratic Party
 Steve Miller, attorney, affiliated with the Democratic Party
 Jermaine Reed, city councilman
 Scott Taylor, city councilman
 Scott Wagner, city councilman, Mayor Pro Tem

Withdrew
 Rita Berry, businesswoman
 Roi Chinn
 Jason Kander, former Missouri Secretary of State (endorsed Justus)

Declined
 Austin Petersen, businessman and Libertarian candidate for presidential nomination in 2016, Republican candidate for U.S. Senate in 2018

Endorsements

Primary

Primary election

Polling

with Justus and Miller

Results

General election

Results

References

External links

Official campaign websites
Rita Berry for Mayor
Alissia Canady for Mayor
Phil Glynn for Mayor
Jolie Justus for Mayor 
Jason Kander for Mayor
Quinton Lucas for Mayor
Steve Miller for Mayor
Jermaine Reed for Mayor
Scott Taylor for Mayor 

2010s in Kansas City, Missouri
2019 Missouri elections
2019 United States mayoral elections
2019
Non-partisan elections